Downing is an unincorporated community located in Comanche County, in the U.S. state of Texas. According to the Handbook of Texas, the community had a population of 30 in 2000.

History
The area in what is now known as Downing today was first settled in the early 1880s. A man named Walter Henry Loudermilk wanted the name of the community to be Dawning due to the beautiful sunrises in the community, but an error by the post office in Washington gave it the name Downing instead. The postmaster was a man named William C. Davis, who was hired on November 26, 1888. It then received its mail from the city of Comanche on May 11, 1911. The community's population was 103 in 1940 and subsequently declined. Its population plunged to 20 from 1980 through 1990 and grew to 30 in 2000.

Downing has its own cemetery. The first grave placed is unknown, but it was reported to be Mary Carnes, who died on April 15, 1866. Other people buried include those who died while traveling to other places and some Native Americans as well.

Geography

Education
Public education in the community of Downing is provided by the De Leon Independent School District. Downing once had a school building near the cemetery and its bell hangs there today.

References

Unincorporated communities in Comanche County, Texas
Unincorporated communities in Texas